Martín Miguel de Güemes International Airport  is located  southwest of the center of Salta, capital city of Salta Province, in Argentina. The airport covers an area of 208 hectares (513 acres) and is operated by Aeropuertos Argentina 2000

Also known as El Aybal Airport, it is the main hub of the Argentine Andes, served by Aerolíneas Argentinas and Andes Líneas Aéreas. In 2012 it handled 690,712 passengers, making it the most used airport in northern Argentina. The new terminal was built in 2000 by Aeropuertos Argentina 2000.

In late 2013, Boliviana de Aviacion planned to return to Salta Airport, restarting its route to Santa Cruz de la Sierra-Viru Viru. This is an important connection to international destinations, such as São Paulo-Guarulhos, Madrid-Barajas and Lima outside Buenos Aires.

Airlines and destinations

Statistics

See also

Transport in Argentina
List of airports in Argentina

References

External links 
Aeropuertos de Salta El Site con toda la info sobre los aeropuertos de Salta.
Salta, SLA - Aeropuertos Argentinos 2000

Airports in Argentina
Buildings and structures in Salta
Buildings and structures in Salta Province